The 12939 / 12940 Pune–Jaipur Superfast Express is an intercity train of the Indian Railways connecting Pune in Maharashtra and  of Rajasthan. It is currently being operated with 12939/12940 train numbers on bi-weekly basis.

Service

The 12939/Pune–Jaipur SF Express has an average speed of 59 km/hr and covers 1294 km in 22 hrs 05 mins. 12940/Jaipur–Pune SF Express has an average speed of 57 km/hr and covers 1294 km in 22 hrs 50 mins.

Route & Halts 

The important halts of the train are:

Coach composition

The train consists of 22 LHB coach :

 1 AC First-class cum AC II TIER
 2 AC II Tier
 3 AC III Tier
 10 Sleeper coaches
 4 General
 2 Second-class Luggage/parcel van

Traction

Both trains are hauled by a Vadodara based WAP-7 electric locomotive from Pune to Jaipur and vice versa.

Direction reversal

The train reverses its direction 1 time:

Notes

External links 

 12939/Pune - Jaipur SF Express
 12940/Jaipur - Pune SF Express

References 

Express trains in India
Rail transport in Maharashtra
Rail transport in Madhya Pradesh
Rail transport in Gujarat
Rail transport in Rajasthan
Transport in Jaipur
Transport in Pune
Railway services introduced in 2010